Elgheia is a mountain of Akershus, Norway.

Mountains of Viken